Cuckoo bumblebees are members of the subgenus Psithyrus in the bumblebee genus Bombus. Until recently, the 28 species of Psithyrus were considered to constitute a separate genus. They are a specialized socially parasitic lineage which parasitises the nests of 'true' bumblebees, resulting in the loss of the ability to collect pollen and establish their own nests. Cuckoo bumblebees do not create a worker caste and produce only male and female reproductives. They are considered inquilines in the colonies of 'true' bumblebees. 

Cuckoo bumblebee females emerge from hibernation later than their host species to ensure that their host has had sufficient time to establish a nest. Before finding and invading a host colony, a Psithyrus female feeds directly from flowers until her ovaries are sufficiently developed, at which time she begins seeking a nest to invade. Once she has located and infiltrated a host colony, the Psithyrus female usurps the nest by killing or subduing the host queen. She then lays her own eggs, exploiting the host workers to feed her and her developing young through pheromones and/or physical attacks.

Selected species
 Bombus ashtoni
 Bombus barbutellus
Bombus bellardii
 Bombus bohemicus
Bombus branickii
 Bombus campestris
Bombus chinensis
 Bombus citrinus
Bombus coreanus
 Bombus cornutus
Bombus expolitus
 Bombus fernaldae
Bombus ferganicus
 Bombus flavidus
 Bombus insularis
Bombus monozonous
Bombus morawitzianus
Bombus norvegicus
 Bombus quadricolor
 Bombus rupestris
Bombus skorikovi
 Bombus suckleyi
 Bombus sylvestris
Bombus tibetanus
Bombus turneri
 Bombus variabilis
 Bombus vestalis

Gallery

References

Further reading
Michener, C.D. (2000). The Bees of the World. Johns Hopkins University Press.
Macdonald, M. & Nisbet, G. (2006). Highland Bumblebees: Distribution, Ecology and Conservation. HBRG, Inverness, http://www.hbrg.org.uk. .

Bumblebees
Insect subgenera